Daxing is a town under the administration of Lüchun County, Yunnan, China. , it has seven residential communities and seven villages under its administration.

References 

Township-level divisions of Honghe Hani and Yi Autonomous Prefecture
Lüchun County